Saint Cennych was a Pre-congregational saint of medieval, South Wales.  He is the patron Saint of Llangennych, Carmarthenshire.

See also
 Llangennech
 Llangennech railway station
 Saints of Wales

References

6th-century Christian saints
Year of birth unknown